Hypsopygia plumbeoprunalis is a species of snout moth in the genus Hypsopygia. It was described by George Hampson in 1917 and is found in Ecuador.

References

Moths described in 1917
Pyralini